St Joseph Church  is a parish of the Roman Catholic Church located near Dushanbe International Airport in Dushanbe, Tajikistan.

Masses in the church for the small Catholic community are held in Russian. The church follows the Roman or Latin Rite and is part of the mission sui juris of Tajikistan. In the same area there is another parish church that is dedicated to St Roch.

Parishioners are from different ethnic groups or nationalities including Germans, Lithuanians, Poles, Russians and Tajiks. This diversity stems from the deportations in the Soviet Union in the 1930s and 1940s.

See also
St. Joseph's Church (disambiguation)
Roman Catholicism in Tajikistan
Christianity in Tajikistan

References

Roman Catholic churches in Tajikistan
Buildings and structures in Dushanbe